Éder Citadin Martins (born 15 November 1986), simply known as Éder, is a professional footballer who plays as a forward for Criciúma.

Born in Brazil with Italian ancestry, Éder moved to Italy at age 19, where he spent most of his professional career (from 2006 to 2018). He began his career with Brazilian club Criciúma, and moved to Italian club Empoli in January 2006, spending most of his career in the country for clubs such as Empoli, Sampdoria and Inter Milan. In 2018, he moved to China, joining Inter Milan's sister club Jiangsu Suning. Following the club's dissolution in 2021, he returned to Brazil, joining São Paulo.

Éder was born in Brazil, but qualifies to play for Italy through his Italian passport and more than two-years of residency in Italy. He made his international debut for Italy in March 2015, and scored two goals in their successful qualification campaign for UEFA Euro 2016, also being selected for the final tournament.

Early life
Éder holds dual nationality (Brazilian and Italian) as his great-grandfather, Battista Righetto, was from Nove in the Province of Vicenza. He was named in tribute to Éder Aleixo de Assis, striker of the Brazil national team during the 1982 FIFA World Cup.

Club career

Early years
Born in Lauro Müller, Santa Catarina state, Éder started his career at Criciúma Esporte Clube. He made his first team – and Campeonato Brasileiro Série A – debut on 19 December 2004, coming on as a second-half substitute in a 3–3 home draw against Coritiba, with his side being already relegated.

Éder was definitely promoted to the first team ahead of the 2005 season, and scored his first goal on 30 January of that year, but in a 3–2 Campeonato Catarinense home loss against Joinville. He finished the tournament with three goals in ten appearances, and scored in his Campeonato Brasileiro Série B debut against São Raimundo-AM on 26 April, finishing a 2–0 home success.

At the age of 19 and with five goals in 19 league appearances during the year, Éder was signed by Italian club Empoli.

Frosinone
Éder signed with Frosinone in a co-ownership deal for a fee of €600,000 in June 2008 following a loan spell during the second half of the 2007–08 Serie B season.

Return to Empoli
Empoli bought Éder back from Frosinone in June 2009 for €2.42 million following an impressive Serie B season by the striker. He scored four goals in one Serie B game on 13 April 2010, two of which were penalties, in a 5–2 victory for Empoli over Salernitana. He finished the 2009–10 Serie B season as top scorer, with 27 goals.

Loans to Brescia & Cesena
On 20 August 2010, Éder signed a 1+4 year contract with Serie A newcomers Brescia, meaning that Éder would join Brescia on loan for the first year. Brescia later revealed in its financial report that the loan fee was €1.8 million.

Éder scored just six goals for the club and on 13 July 2011 was transferred to Cesena from Empoli in a temporary deal for €2.2 million (which later compensate by the loan fee from Sampdoria).

Sampdoria
On 24 January 2012, Éder moved to Sampdoria on a loan deal for €1.1 million fee to Cesena. He scored his first goal for the club on 21 April 2012 in a 1–1 draw with Vicenza. On 3 July 2012, Sampdoria signed Éder outright for €3 million on a five-year contract from Empoli, making Eder had cost Sampdoria €4.1 million in total, while on Empoli side, the club received €7 million fee from 2010 to 2012.

Internazionale
On 29 January 2016, Éder joined Inter on a 1½-year loan deal for €1.2 million which could be made permanent upon the fulfillment of certain conditions. He signed a contract that could keep him at Inter until 2020, and is receiving a wage of reported €1.5 million per year. He was presented to the media on the very same day, where he was assigned the number 23, saying that he did not think twice about signing with Inter. He made his debut for the club on 31 January, in a 3–0 defeat to cross-city rivals Milan in the Derby della Madonnina.

After making his first friendly appearance for Inter of the 2016–17 season on 14 August, the obligation to purchase him in a definitive deal was activated. On 28 January of the following year, Éder celebrated his 200th Serie A appearance by scoring in a 3–0 home win over Pescara. On 14 May 2017, Éder came off the bench to scoring his team's only goal in the 1–2 home defeat to Sassuolo, before profiting from Mauro Icardi's injury to start in the last two league matches, scoring against Lazio and a brace against Udinese, taking his tally up to 8 league goals. It was also the first time that Éder had scored in three Serie A matches in a row as an Inter player, and first time since November 2015. He finished his first full season with Inter by making 40 appearances in all competitions, including 33 in Serie A and 6 in Europa League, scoring 10 goals in the process, 8 of which came in Serie A and 2 in the Europa League.

On 2 November 2017, Éder signed a contract extension, penning a new deal until June 2021. Only three days later, he came off the bench to score his first 2017–18 season goal in the 1–1 draw against Torino to help Inter remain undefeated. Éder made his first starts of the 2017–18 season later in February 2018, profiting from Icardi's injury; the first was in the 1–1 draw versus Crotone where he netted a header in the first half and the second was versus Bologna where he scored inside 90 seconds to lead Inter into a 2–1 home win, the first after eight league matches.

Jiangsu Suning
On 13 July 2018, Éder signed with Chinese club Jiangsu Suning for a reported €5.5 million.

On 12 November 2020, Éder scored in the second-leg of the Chinese Super League finals against Guangzhou Evergrande. Jiangsu Suning won the match 2–1, with an aggregate victory of the same scoreline, securing the club's first league title in their history.

São Paulo
On 26 March 2021, Éder joined São Paulo FC on a deal running until December 2022.

International career
Éder, as a dual citizen of Italy and Brazil, was eligible to play for both nations. He qualified for the Italy national team through his Italian citizenship as well as more than 2-year of residence in Italy; he qualified to Italian citizenship through his Italian great-grandfather Battista Righetto, who came from Nove in Veneto.

He was previously included in Brazil's preliminary squad for the 2008 Summer Olympics, however, he did not get a place in the final squad list by coach Dunga.

Éder began to be considered for the Italian national team by head coach Antonio Conte due to his good form in the 2014–15 season with Sampdoria.

There was controversy surrounding Antonio Conte's call-up for Éder and Franco Vázquez, respectively born in Brazil and Argentina. Speaking at a Serie A meeting on 23 March 2015, Inter manager Roberto Mancini stated, "The Italian national team should be Italian. An Italian player deserves to play for the national team while someone who wasn't born in Italy, even if they have relatives, I don't think they deserve to." Conte's response to the use of overseas-born players was: "If Mauro Camoranesi [who was born in Argentina] was allowed to help Italy win the 2006 World Cup, then why can't Éder and Franco Vázquez lead the Azzurri to glory in next year's European Championship?"

On 28 March 2015, Éder made his debut for Italy, coming on as a 58th-minute substitute for Simone Zaza in a Euro 2016 qualifier against Bulgaria and scoring the equaliser in a 2–2 draw in the 84th minute. He made his first start three days later against England in a 1–1 draw in Turin, making way for fellow oriundo Vázquez after 61 minutes. On 10 October 2015, Éder opened the scoring in a 3–1 away win over Azerbaijan, which sealed Italy's qualification for UEFA Euro 2016. On 31 May 2016, he was named to Conte's 23-man Italy squad for Euro 2016. On 17 June, he scored the only goal against Sweden in the 88th minute during the second group game, which qualified Italy to the Round of 16; he was named Man of the Match by UEFA.

Style of play
Éder is a quick, strong, and tenacious forward with an accurate shot, who usually plays in a central role as a main striker, due to his pace, positional sense, attacking movement, tactical intelligence, and eye for goal, which make him particularly effective during counter-attacks. A versatile, hard-working, and technically gifted player, with good vision, he is also effective as a second striker, as a left winger, or even as an attacking midfielder, positions which allow him to provide depth to his team and participate in build-up plays, play off of his teammates, hold up the ball, and provide assists. Possessing substantial physical strength, despite his relatively small stature, he can also be effective in the air, as well as from set-pieces and penalties. In addition to his offensive and creative abilities, Éder has also stood out for his stamina and defensive work-rate, which make him extremely useful when his team are not in possession.

Career statistics

Club

International

Italy score listed first, score column indicates score after each Éder goal.

Honours
Jiangsu Suning
Chinese Super League: 2020

São Paulo
Campeonato Paulista: 2021

Individual
Serie B top scorer: 2009–10 (27 goals)

References

External links

 Internazionale official profile
 Éder – Serie A competition record
 AIC profile 
 FIGC profile 
 
 
 

1986 births
Living people
Italian footballers
Brazilian footballers
Sportspeople from Santa Catarina (state)
People of Venetian descent
Brazilian people of Italian descent
Italian people of Brazilian descent
Association football forwards
Campeonato Brasileiro Série A players
Campeonato Brasileiro Série B players
Serie A players
Serie B players
Chinese Super League players
Criciúma Esporte Clube players
Empoli F.C. players
Frosinone Calcio players
Brescia Calcio players
A.C. Cesena players
U.C. Sampdoria players
Inter Milan players
Jiangsu F.C. players
São Paulo FC players
UEFA Euro 2016 players
Italy international footballers
Brazilian expatriate footballers
Expatriate footballers in Italy
Brazilian expatriate sportspeople in Italy
Expatriate footballers in China
Italian expatriate sportspeople in China
Brazilian expatriate sportspeople in China